Truskovice is a municipality and village in Strakonice District in the South Bohemian Region of the Czech Republic. It has about 200 inhabitants.

Administrative parts
The village of Dlouhá Ves is an administrative part of Truskovice.

References

Villages in Strakonice District